Hamzeh Deh may refer to:
 Hamzeh Deh-e Olya
 Hamzeh Deh-e Sofla